Mohammadabad-e Khvajeh Beyglu (also Romanized as Moḩammadābād-e Khvājeh Beyglū; also known as Moḩammadābād) is a village in Gilvan Rural District, in the Central District of Tarom County, Zanjan Province, Iran. At the 2006 census, its population was 122, in 29 families.

References 

Populated places in Tarom County